The A340 is a major road in the south of England, portions of which are known as the Aldermaston Road, Tadley Hill, Basingstoke Road and Tidmarsh Road.

Route
Starting in the south of Basingstoke, Hampshire, it runs west, forming the western side of the Basingstoke ringroad, before swinging north to Tadley and then enters Berkshire. It passes the gates of the Atomic Weapons Establishment at Aldermaston, before passing through the village of Aldermaston itself and then joining the A4 at Aldermaston Wharf.

See also
 Great Britain road numbering scheme

References 

Roads in England
Roads in Berkshire
Transport in Hampshire